The Frederiksborger is Denmark's oldest horse breed. They were tremendously popular throughout the Renaissance and Baroque periods and were considered luxury items. Today, the breed is rare, but has a loyal following. Stallions and mares undergo studbook inspections before being allowed to breed. They are most often chestnut with white markings.

History
The Royal Frederiksborg Stud was founded in 1562 under King Frederik II, who populated it with the Neapolitan horse and the Iberian forerunners of the Andalusian horse. As the Norfolk Roadster and Arab-bred horses gained popularity later on, they, too, were selected to stand at the royal stud. As a courtly mount, the Frederiksborg had to be agile and trainable for the courtiers' pursuits in haute ecole and warfare, stylish and high-stepping for parades and court ceremonies, and strong and uniform in appearance to trot before the royal carriages. By the 18th century, the Frederiksborger enjoyed such particular fame that the Danes began to export them in great numbers. They contributed to the formation of the heavy warmbloods, but also to the Lipizzaner. A grey Frederiksborger stallion born in 1765, Pluto, became a foundation stallion in the breed.

The popularity of the breed took its toll, and in 1839, the royal stud was closed. The breeding of Frederiksborgers continued with private breeders, though the needs of the people reshaped the horse to some degree. Instead of a luxury item, the horses were redirected to be more suitable for the stagecoach and agricultural work. In 1939, efforts to re-establish the breed were started, adding East Friesian, Oldenburgs, Thoroughbreds, and Arabians later. The modern Danish Warmblood often traces back to the Frederiksborger through the female lines, though the pedigrees of these horses are mostly German. Nevertheless, as the Danish breeders made use of German and Swedish horses, some part-Frederiksborger mares made their way back into the breeding population. So too do the Holsteiner Manfreid (Markgraf), Swedish Rousseau (Herzog), and the Hanoverians Atlantic (Abglanz), Ergo (Abendjaeger), and Boheme (Bolero). Otherwise, the Frederiksborger has been purebred for the past century, which accounts for their uniform type.

Characteristics
Today, the numbers of Frederiksborgers are low, but the remaining examples are handsome horses. They are most often vividly marked flaxen chestnuts, though bays, buckskins, palominos, and greys are seen, as well. They usually have sabino-type markings and many have rabicano roaning, as well.

In conformation and type, the Frederiksborger was "ahead of its time", so the horses express great quality and are quite uniform. The  muzzle is wide and the straight lines of the head often border on convex. The neck is powerful and usually crested, and is set high on strong shoulders. The withers are not high, and the back, while long, has a strong loin. The hindquarters are broad and deep and the croup is level. The level topline and high-set neck of the Frederiksborger belie its showy trot. The legs are solid and square, a little more than half the horse's height. The tail is well-carried.

The gaits of the Frederiksborger are expressive and powerful, with natural self-carriage. The trot is the best gait and is showy with a long stride. The walk is diligent and open, and the canter is sufficient. Most Frederiksborgers are willing jumpers, though calm-natured horses are less likely to be concerned about knocking rails.

Uses
Frederiksborgers are best in harness and compete up to the international levels of combined driving. They are also suitable horses for amateurs, as they are not selected for sensitivity. Some individuals are successful in competitive dressage and show jumping, as well.

Medical issues
Frederiksborgers are early-maturing, long-lived, and sound reproductively and structurally well into their old age. The greatest concern facing the health of the Frederiksborger is inbreeding due to a limited gene pool. However, studbook inspections are intended to safeguard the breed against weakness; a horse with a known genetic disorder is not approved to breed.

References
 "Frederiksborg," from Oklahoma State livestock breeds
 Breed Association

Horse breeds
Horse breeds originating in Denmark